History (The Very Best Of Dune) is a compilation album by German band Dune. It was released in October 2000 on the label Orbit Records. It includes the new single "Hardcore Vibes 2000" featuring Trubblemaker. As an extra bonus this album exclusively contains the first Dune computer game Keep The Secret. The tracks Back To The Future, Here I Am and Space Invaders were from the cancelled album Reunion.

Track listing
 "Hardcore Vibes 2000" – 3:16
 "Are You Ready To Fly (Radio Edit)" – 3:32
 "Can't Stop Raving (Video Mix)" – 3:34
 "Rainbow to the Stars (Video Mix)" – 3:27
 "Hand in Hand (Video Mix)" – 3:45
 "Million Miles from Home" – 3:58
 "Who Wants to Live Forever (Komakino Remix Cut)" – 4:39
 "Nothing Compares 2 U (Beam & Yanou Radio Cut)" – 3:44
 "Keep The Secret (Radio Edit)" – 3:26
 "Electric Heaven (Kay Cee Remix Cut)" – 4:24
 "Dark Side Of The Moon (Video Mix)" – 3:16
 "Back To The Future" – 3:48
 "Here I Am" – 3:58
 "Space Invaders" – 4:14

2000 compilation albums
Dune (band) albums